The Vows of Silence is a novel by Susan Hill. It is the fourth in a series of  "Simon Serrailler" crime novels.

References

Novels by Susan Hill
British crime novels
2008 British novels
Chatto & Windus books